Wilhelm Ehmann (5 December 1904 – 16 April 1989) was a German musicologist, editor, church musician and conductor. He founded the choir Westfälische Kantorei that toured internationally and made many recordings. He was a cofounder and director of the later Hochschule für Kirchenmusik Herford.

Career 
Ehmann was born in Freistatt, the son of a dean at the Bethel Institution. After working as an elementary school teacher for a short time, he studied musicology at the universities of Freiburg and Leipzig, with Wilibald Gurlitt, among others. He was promoted to Ph.D. in Freiburg. He worked first as an assistant at the university and Gauchormeister of Baden. He joined the Nazi Party in 1937. From 1938, he was a private lecturer and editor of the magazine Deutsche Musikkultur. He also worked for the department of organ music at the Reichsjugendführung From 1940 to 1945, he was the head of the institute of musicology at the University of Innsbruck.

After World War II, he moved to  near Herford, where he was church musician of the village church. He was also a lecturer for church music at the University of Münster. He was on the boards of national and international institutions of church music, including the Arbeitskreis für Haus- und Jugendmusik from 1951, the Internationaler Arbeitskreis Musik from 1951, the Internationale Heinrich-Schütz-Gesellschaft from 1956, and Deutscher Musikrat from 1959. He died in Freiburg im Breisgau.

Choral and brass music 
Ehmann focused on performing choral sacred music and pursued historically informed performance early, recording works by Dieterich Buxtehude, Heinrich Schütz and Johann Sebastian Bach, among others. He also conducted works by more recent composers such as Hugo Distler and Ernst Pepping. He founded the Westfälische Kantorei (Westphalian Chorale) which became known internationally. He published introductions to choral conducting, such as Die Chorführung in 1968. He also inspired historically informed performance for brass ensembles, leading to reproductions of historic instruments. He published tutorials for brass music such as Die Bläserfibel from 1951, and also music for brass such as Alte Spielmusik für Bläser. He toured in Europe, the Near East and Far East, Africa and the US. In 1957 he founded the first record label focused on sacred music, Cantate, together with Carl Merseburger. He taught choral conductors in master classes, especially in the US and St. Moritz, Switzerland. His textbooks on choral conducting were translated to English.

Awards 
 Bundesverdienstkreuz 1. Klasse (9 July 1969)

References

Further reading
 Gerhard Mittring (ed.),  (ed.): Musik als Lobgesang. Festschrift für Wilhelm Ehmann (zum 60. Geburtstag am 5. Dezember 1964). Tonkunst Verlag Merseburger, Darmstadt 1964.
 Kurt Drexel: Musikwissenschaft und NS-Ideologie, dargestellt am Beispiel der Universität Innsbruck von 1938 bis 1945. Publikationsstelle der Universität Innsbruck, Innsbruck 1994 (Veröffentlichungen der Universität Innsbruck, Vol. 202).
 Eckhard John: "Der Mythos vom Deutschen in der deutschen Musik. Die Freiburger Musikwissenschaft im NS-Staat", in: Musik in Baden-Württemberg. Jahrbuch 5 (1998), pp 57–84. 
 Mit Posaune, Chor und Taktstock, Schriften des Landeskirchlichen Archivs, Band 5, Bielefeld 1999

External links 
 
 
 Wilhelm Ehmann / Bach Cantatas & Other Vocal Works Bach Cantatas Website 2015

German male conductors (music)
1904 births
1989 deaths
Musicians from Lower Saxony
University of Freiburg alumni
Leipzig University alumni
Academic staff of the University of Münster
Officers Crosses of the Order of Merit of the Federal Republic of Germany
20th-century German musicologists
20th-century German conductors (music)
20th-century German male musicians